William Logan (December 9, 1914 – October 2, 2002) was an American cyclist. He competed in the tandem and team pursuit events at the 1936 Summer Olympics.

References

External links
 

1914 births
2002 deaths
American male cyclists
Olympic cyclists of the United States
Cyclists at the 1936 Summer Olympics
People from Hackettstown, New Jersey
Sportspeople from Warren County, New Jersey